Muzikantská Liduška is a 1940 Czech drama film directed by Martin Frič.

Cast
 Gustav Hilmar as Farmer Stanek
 Marie Blazková as Stanek's wife
 Jiřina Štěpničková as Liduska
 Hermína Vojtová as Landlady Krejzova
 Vilém Pfeiffer as Krejzova's son
 Ella Nollová as Frantina - herbewoman
 Karel Cerný as Jaros - clarinetist
 Gustav Nezval as Toník
 Jaroslav Marvan as Liska
 Eman Fiala as Chomelka
 Josef Príhoda as Trumpetist
 Alois Dvorský as Clarinetist
 Ludvík Veverka as Lahoza
 Vojta Merten as Homolka
 Ferenc Futurista as Soucek

References

External links
 

1940 films
1940 drama films
1940s Czech-language films
Czechoslovak black-and-white films
Films directed by Martin Frič
Czechoslovak drama films
1940s Czech films